San Pedro is a district of the Sarchí canton, in the Alajuela province of Costa Rica.

History 
San Pedro was created on 14 December 1964 by Ley 3467. Segregated from Sarchí Sur.

Geography 
San Pedro has an area of  km² and an elevation of  metres.

Economy
There is an annual tomato fair in the San Pedro hamlet of Trojas town of this district, in which the local version of La Tomatina occurs.

Demographics 

For the 2011 census, San Pedro had a population of  inhabitants.

Transportation

Road transportation 
The district is covered by the following road routes:
 National Route 118
 National Route 708

References 

Districts of Alajuela Province
Populated places in Alajuela Province